Weed was written and illustrated by Yoshihiro Takahashi. It is a sequel to his 1980s series Silver Fang -The Shooting Star Gin-, and follows the son of Gin, the title character from the original series. It began serialization in Weekly Manga Goraku magazine in 1999. The Japanese publisher Nihon Bungeisha released the series in collected volumes from January 2000 to September 2009. Cumulatively, 60 volumes were published. In October 2006, Nihon Bungeisha released the first volume of a reprinted edition of Weed. The company has released 22 volumes of the reprint edition, with the latest published in December 2007. The American company ComicsOne licensed the series for release in the United States and Canada in 2000 with the first three volumes released between March and June 2001. Additionally, they provided an Adobe Digital Editions e-book version. ComicsOne later went bankrupt. American publisher DrMaster acquired the rights to some of ComicsOne's titles, but not Weed. While the physical copies are out-of-print, the e-book version is still available.
Under their G-Comics imprint, Nihon Bungeisha released several Weed omnibus editions labeled as "specials". A series of three specials were released in April 2004 called . Throughout 2009 and 2010, another set of eight "specials" were produced: Tabidachi Hen (September 2009), Senshi no Shōmei Hen (October 2009), Inuzoku no Tsutome Hen (November 2009), Otoko no Yakusoku Hen (December 2009), Taiman Shōbu Hen (January 2010), Taishō no Utsuwa Hen (February 2010), Dōshu Taiketsu Hen (March 2010), and Uketsuga Reshi Kiba Hen (April 2010).

Volume list

Weed

Ginga Densetsu Weed: Orion

Ginga: The Last Wars

Ginga Densetsu Noah

References

Weed